The St. Julien House is a historic house located at 203 East 2nd Street in Broussard, Louisiana.

Built in c.1910 by Mrs. Marguerite Helena Roy St. Julien, widow of Gustave St. Julien, the house is a -story building in Queen Anne-Colonial Revival style, which was built as a copy of the nearby Comeaux House except for the turret and the cupola. Like the building it was replicating, the house was converted to a restaurant in 1979 with small alterations which did not affect its main architectural features.

The building was listed on the National Register of Historic Places on March 14, 1983.

It is one of 10 individually NRHP-listed houses in the "Broussard Multiple Resource Area", which also includes: 
Alesia House
Billeaud House
Martial Billeaud Jr. House
Valsin Broussard House 
Comeaux House
Ducrest Building
Janin Store 
Roy-LeBlanc House
St. Cecilia School 

Main Street Historic District

See also
 National Register of Historic Places listings in Lafayette Parish, Louisiana

References

Houses on the National Register of Historic Places in Louisiana
Queen Anne architecture in Louisiana
Colonial Revival architecture in Louisiana
Houses completed in 1910
Lafayette Parish, Louisiana
National Register of Historic Places in Lafayette Parish, Louisiana